Prema Jatukanyaprateep, known by the pen name Prema-ja, is a Thai cartoonist and animator. She studied decorative art at Silpakorn University then animation techniques at Ecole Pivaut in France. Her comic book Bokbig won the 2013 Gold Award at the 7th International MANGA Award.

Works
 Bokbig published by Cartoon Thai Institute, Foundation for Children (2012)

Awards
 Bokbig - 2013 Gold Award at the 7th International MANGA Award

References

External links
 http://www.nationmultimedia.com/sunday/Got-that-manga-nailed-30229815.html

Thai comics artists
Prema Jatukanyaprateep
Prema Jatukanyaprateep
Prema Jatukanyaprateep
Year of birth missing (living people)
Living people
Prema Jatukanyaprateep